Millers Run is a  long 3rd order tributary to Chartiers Creek in Allegheny and Washington Counties, Pennsylvania.

Variant names
According to the Geographic Names Information System, it has also been known historically as:
Miller's Run

Course
Millers Run rises in a pond about 2 miles southwest of Primrose, Pennsylvania and then flows east-northeast to join Chartiers Creek at about 0.25 miles northeast of Sygan Hill, Pennsylvania.

Watershed
Millers Run drains  of area, receives about 39.0 in/year of precipitation, has a wetness index of 332.89, and is about 52% forested.

See also
 List of rivers of Pennsylvania

References

Rivers of Pennsylvania
Rivers of Allegheny County, Pennsylvania
Rivers of Washington County, Pennsylvania